Burnett Springs is the site of a former resort community in rural Logan County, Arkansas. The area was developed as a spring-based spa resort by Captain John Burnette in the 1870s. A small town sprang around a three-story spa hotel, which fell into decline after 1915. The hotel burned in 1930, and all of the other buildings have succumbed to the elements. The only surviving above-ground feature is one of the spring sites, which is set in a stone reservoir box shelter from erosion by stone walls.

The site was listed on the National Register of Historic Places in 1995.

See also
National Register of Historic Places listings in Logan County, Arkansas

References

National Register of Historic Places in Logan County, Arkansas